Bashir Hayford is a Ghanaian football manager who currently serves as manager for Ghana Premier League side Legon Cities.

Career
In August 2018, he was appointed as manager of the Ghana women's national football team. In March 2019, he was appointed as manager of the Somalia men's national football team. In February 2020, it was confirmed that Hayford had resigned from managing Somalia, due to the ongoing civil war. He has also handled Asante Kotoko, Ashanti Gold SC, Heart of Lions, Power FC, Medeama SC and Ebusua Dwarfs. He became the coach of Legon Cities FC in November 2020.

Honours

Manager 
Asante Kotoko

 Ghana Premier League: 2007–08

Ashanti Gold

 Ghana Premier League: 2015

References

External links

 Bashir Hayford Interview
 Ghanaian coach hoping to use football to bring Somalia together 

Date of birth missing (living people)
Living people
Ghanaian football managers
Somalia national football team managers
Ghanaian expatriate football managers
Ghanaian expatriate sportspeople in Somalia
Expatriate football managers in Somalia
Year of birth missing (living people)
Asante Kotoko S.C. managers
Ghana women's national football team managers
Ghana Premier League managers
Cape Coast Ebusua Dwarfs F.C. managers